Warren Johnson (born July 7, 1943 in Virginia, Minnesota) is a retired American NHRA drag racing driver. He is the driver with the 2nd most wins in pro stock with 97 career wins, six world championships and earned himself the nickname "The Professor of Pro Stock."

Career
In 1995, Johnson had one of the biggest comebacks in NHRA history. After the alleged season ending vandalism of the cars driven by Darrell Alderman and Scott Geoffrion, Johnson started gaining points, and had gained over 500 points with the season half completed to clinch the championship that year.

In 1997, he became the first NHRA Pro Stock driver to exceed 200 mph with a pass of 200.13 mph at Richmond, Virginia. He became the first Pro Stock driver to make a sub-6.9-second pass with a 6.894-second run at Richmond, Va. In 2006, Johnson reached his 500th career race.

On May 2, 2010, at age 66, Warren became the oldest professional winner in NHRA history, as he won the AAA Midwest Nationals in Madison Illinois.

Currently, Johnson is a member of the Kiz Toys’ Board of Advisors. Kiz Toys is a toy company based out of Cumming, Georgia, and Johnson advises the company on automotive aspects of the KizMoto line, Kiz Toys’ initial product line. Johnson reviews product designs and development on an ongoing basis and offers suggestions on current and future products associated with KizMoto. As of May 2010, he won the National Hot Rod Association's Pro Stock championship in six seasons and 97 NHRA national events. Johnson is also a two time IHRA champion in the Mountain Motor Pro Stock division.

Awards
In 2001, a panel ranked him seventh in the National Hot Rod Association Top 50 Drivers, 1951–2000. 
He was inducted in the International Motorsports Hall of Fame in 2007.
In 2015, he was inducted in the Motorsports Hall of Fame of America.

References

External links
Kiz Toys Board of Advisors

1943 births
Living people
People from Virginia, Minnesota
Dragster drivers
Racing drivers from Minnesota